Craig Dahl (born January 28, 1953) is an American ice hockey coach. He was the head coach of St. Cloud State from 1987 thru 2005. After retiring from coaching for about six years, Dahl returned to help Chris Schultz at SUNY Geneseo starting in 2011-12.

Career
Though Dahl received a football scholarship from the University of Minnesota, he transferred to and graduated from Pacific Lutheran University in 1976 with a degree in physical education and social sciences. Dahl began his coaching career a few years later when he took over the top job at Bethel College from David Harris. Over the course of 5 seasons at the helm Dahl directed the fledgling program on an upwards trajectory, going from 3 wins in his first season to 15 in his last, including being named 1985 MIAC Coach of the Year. Dahl moved east for 1985-86, taking over at Wisconsin–River Falls before receiving the opportunity to serve under storied college coach Herb Brooks as an assistant with St. Cloud State as it was getting ready to move up to Division I.

Dahl remained as an assistant for only one season, however, as Brooks moved back to the NHL to coach the Minnesota North Stars the next year. With the Huskies playing as a D-I independent starting in 1987-88, Dahl was offered the head coaching duties and proceeded to serve in that position for the next 19 years. In only his second year, Dahl led the Huskies to their first tournament berth but lost both games against defending champion Lake Superior State in the first round. In 1991 St. Cloud joined the WCHA, giving it a much better opportunity to receive further invites to the NCAA tournament though it took over a decade for the Huskies t make their return. Despite playing against multiple powerhouse teams throughout the 1990s, Dahl was able to keep St. Cloud's record respectable, posting 4 winning seasons and finishing with a sub-.400 mark only once (1995–96) while also making the conference tournament title game in 1994. Dahl closed out the Huskies first decade with the WCHA by leading St. Cloud to their first tournament berth in 2000. The next season Dahl led the Huskies to their first 30-win season and conference tournament championship (the only time in school for either (as of 2014)). From 2000 to 2003 Dahl brought the St. Cloud to four consecutive NCAA tournament berths but failed to win a single game.

After the 2004-05 season Dahl announced his decision to step down as head coach of St. Cloud State to pursue a career in the private sector. While the move seemed to be an end to Dahl's coaching career he made an unexpected returned behind the bench as a volunteer assistant with SUNY Geneseo in 2011-12, a position he continues to occupy. (as of 2014)

Head coaching record

Ice hockey

See also
List of college men's ice hockey coaches with 400 wins

References

External links
 

1953 births
Living people
American ice hockey coaches
Bethel Royals football coaches
St. Cloud State Huskies men's ice hockey coaches
Pacific Lutheran University alumni
Ice hockey coaches from Minnesota
People from Albert Lea, Minnesota